Compostela is the name of both a municipality and of a town in it that serves as the seat; both are in the Mexican state of Nayarit. The municipality had 62,925 (2005 census) in a total area of 1,848 km² (713.5 sq mi).  The town and its municipal seat had a population of 15,991 in 2000.

Overview
The name was given in honor of Santiago de Compostela in Galicia, Spain; tradition says that "Compostela" comes from Latin campus stellae, "field of stars" (another theory makes it come from composita tella or even compositella).

Compostela is located on the south coast of the state and is bounded in the north by San Blas and Xalisco; in the south by Bahía de Banderas and the state of  Jalisco; in the east by Santa María del Oro, San Pedro Lagunillas and the state of Jalisco; in the west by the Pacific Ocean.

The largest settlements in the municipality are: Compostela (15,991 inhabitants in 2000), Las Varas (12,403), La Peñita de Jaltemba (7,062), Zacualpan (4,468), and Colonia Paraíso Escondido (2,069).

The climate is tempered by elevation, with rains from July to September.  The hottest months are April and May.  The average annual rainfall is  968.5 mm.  The average annual temperature is 22.9 °C.

The economy is heavily based on agriculture.  The main crops are tobacco, corn, beans, coffee, sorghum, and mangoes.  There were around 50,000 head of cattle in 1995.   There were several small gold and silver mines. In manufacturing the main products were cigars, mango packing, rice shelling, soap factories, cattle feed, furniture, and food and drink.

This is a region that attracts a considerable number of local and foreign visitors due to the natural landscape, beaches, historical sites and the international fishing competitions.

Around Las Varas in the direction of the south there are beaches in the zone called Costa Alegre, among which should be mentioned: Chacala and Chacalilla, La Peñita de Jaltemba, Rincón de Guayabitos, Los Ayala, El Monteón, Lo de Marcos and Playa Platanitos, as well as the islands in the bay of Rincón de Guayabitos, with a good infrastructure of services.

Government

Municipal presidents

References

Link to tables of population data from Census of 2005 INEGI: Instituto Nacional de Estadística, Geografía e Informática
Enciclopedia de los Municipios de México (Spanish)

External links
Portal de Carrillo Puerto Nayarit(Spanish)
m.net/ Portal de Las Varas (Spanish)
Portal de Rincón de Guayabitos (Spanish)
Portal de la ciudad compostela Nayarit mexico. (Spanish)

Populated places in Nayarit
Municipalities of Nayarit